Through his career, aviation pioneer Alberto Santos-Dumont designed, built, and demonstrated a variety of types of aircraft—balloons, airships (dirigibles), monoplanes, biplanes, and a helicopter. Research shows that the inventor may have created an even larger number of aircraft.

List

Notes

References

 
 

 

 
Santos-Dumont